The 2013 Martyr's Memorial B-Division League season, also known as the RedBull Martyr's Memorial B-Division League for sponsorship reasons, was the 2013 season of the Martyr's Memorial B-Division League. A total of 13 teams competed in the league. The season began on 4 March 2014 and concluded on 24 April 2014.

Teams

Of the 13 participating teams, eight remain following the 2013 Martyr's Memorial B-Division League. They are joined by two teams promoted from the Martyr's Memorial C-Division League and three relegated from the 2012–13 Martyr's Memorial A-Division League. 

Naya Basti Youth Club was promoted from the 2012 Martyr's Memorial C-Division League. Whereas, Madhyapur Youth Association, Bansbari Football Club and Boudha Football Club were relegated from the 2012-13 Martyr's Memorial A-Division League.

Boys Union Club were promoted to the 2013–14 Martyr's Memorial A-Division League from the previous season. Swoyambhu Club and United Club had to withdraw from the competition due to financial reasons and were relegated to the Martyr's Memorial C-Division League.

Venues
The league was played centrally in one venues in Kathmandu.

League table

Awards

References

Martyr's Memorial B-Division League seasons
2
Nepal